State Road 104 (SR 104), locally known as Dunn Avenue, is a  state highway that travels through the northern part of Jacksonville in the northeastern part of the U.S. state of Florida. It connects US 1/US 23 with US 17.

Route description
SR 104 begins at the intersection of Dunn Avenue and US 1/US 23, where SR 104 takes Dunn Avenue eastward into sparsely-populated residential portions of Jacksonville. East of the interchange with Interstate 295 (I-295), development becomes more frequent, with woodlands still bordering some portions of the road. The road becomes more commercial in nature, with some woodlands on the road, starting at the intersection with SR 115 (Lem Turner Road) and continuing to head east. At Armsdale Road, SR 104 heads south, and becomes a divided road at Rutgers Road, and heads east again at Biscayne Boulevard, where at that point, the woodlands all but disappear from the road. SR 104 has an interchange with I-95, continuing east onto Busch Drive towards its eastern terminus of US 17, where former SR 163 used to continue to the east.

Major intersections

See also
 
 
 List of state roads in Florida

References

104
104
104